It's the Time is an album by bassist Ron Carter recorded in 2007 and originally released on the Japanese Somethin' Else label.

Reception
The AllMusic review by Ian Martin said "With the appearance of the title track as well as Carter himself in a coffee commercial, there was a resurgence in his popularity in Japan, with this album of new recordings the result".

Track listing
All compositions by Ron Carter except where noted
 "It's the Time" − 2:53
 "Eddie's Theme" − 4:56
 "Mack the Knife" (Kurt Weill, Bertolt Brecht) − 5:44
 "Candle Light" − 5:19
 "Softly, as in a Morning Sunrise" (Sigmund Romberg, Oscar Hammerstein II) − 5:37	
 "I Can't Get Started" (Vernon Duke, Ira Gershwin) − 8:20
 "Super Strings" − 4:54
 "My Ship" (Weill, Gershwin) − 7:53	
 "Laverne Walk" (Oscar Pettiford) − 6:06	
 "It's the Time" [TVCM Version] − 2:20

Personnel
Ron Carter – bass, piccolo bass 
Mitsuaki Kishi (track 1), Mulgrew Miller (tracks 1-9) − piano 
Russell Malone − guitar (tracks 1-9)
Makoto Rikitake  − drums (track 10) 
Motoya Hamaguchi − percussion (track 10)

References

Ron Carter albums
2007 albums